R. A. Rooney & Sons Ltd. was a maker of shaving brushes, with over 200 years in business both in the UK and overseas (plus more than a century in Galway, Ireland). The exact origin of this company is unknown because of a huge fire in 1886 at their Bishopsgate plant that destroyed most of their old records.

Rooney, now called The City of London Brushworks, offers both machine-made and handmade brushes. Many of their bristle buyers and bristle dressers have been with the company for over 50 years.

Companies based in the City of London